Olena Khodyreva is a former Ukrainian football defender, who played for Zhytlobud-2 Kharkiv in the Ukrainian League. She previously played for Lehenda Chernihiv and Naftokhimik Kalush in Ukraine and Nadezhda Noginsk and Zvezda Perm in the Russian Championship. She has played the European Cup with Gömrükçü Baku, Lehenda and Zvezda.

She is a member of the Ukraine national team since 2001, and took part in the 2009 European Championship.

Titles
 2 Russian Leagues (2007, 2008)
 1 Russian Cup (2007)
 5 Ukrainian Leagues (2000, 2001, 2002, 2005, 2009)
 4 Ukrainian Cups (2001, 2002, 2005, 2009)

References

1981 births
Living people
Sportspeople from Kryvyi Rih
Russian women's footballers
Ukrainian women's footballers
WFC Lehenda-ShVSM Chernihiv players
WFC Naftokhimik Kalush players
WFC Zhytlobud-2 Kharkiv players
Expatriate women's footballers in Russia
Expatriate women's footballers in Azerbaijan
Nadezhda Noginsk players
Zvezda 2005 Perm players
Ukraine women's international footballers
Women's association football defenders
Ukrainian expatriate sportspeople in Russia
Ukrainian expatriate sportspeople in Azerbaijan
Ukrainian expatriate women's footballers